The 1991 Mexican Grand Prix was a Formula One motor race held at the Autódromo Hermanos Rodríguez, Mexico City, on 16 June 1991. It was the sixth race of the 1991 Formula One World Championship.

The 67-lap race was won by Italian Riccardo Patrese, driving a Williams-Renault, after he started from pole position. Patrese's teammate, Briton Nigel Mansell, finished second, with Brazilian Ayrton Senna third in a McLaren-Honda.

 this is the most recent Formula One race to feature a car powered by a Porsche engine.

Pre-race
In the run-up to the race, Tyrrell had lost talented designer Harvey Postlethwaite to the Mercedes-Benz sportscar team, while Ayrton Senna had been injured in a jet-ski incident. During Friday qualifying, Senna suffered a big accident at the high-speed Peraltada bend, in which his McLaren rolled and landed upside-down, but he emerged unscathed.

Qualifying

Pre-qualifying report
In the Friday morning pre-qualifying session, JJ Lehto was fastest for Scuderia Italia for the third time this season. His Dallara was over half a second faster than the second-placed runner, Fondmetal's Olivier Grouillard. It was the first time this season that Grouillard had pre-qualified and progressed to the main qualifying sessions. Initially, the third fastest driver was Nicola Larini in the Modena Lambo, but he was later excluded when his rear wing was found to be too high. This promoted the two Jordans one position each, with Andrea de Cesaris taking third, a second faster than Bertrand Gachot in fourth.

Missing out in fifth place was Eric van de Poele in the other Lambo, just 0.056 of a second behind Gachot. Over six seconds behind van de Poele was Pedro Chaves in the Coloni, with the team suffering from financial problems. Emanuele Pirro was seventh in the other Dallara, having not posted a representative lap time.

Pre-qualifying classification

Qualifying report
For the second race in succession, the Williams team filled the front row with Riccardo Patrese ahead of Nigel Mansell. Senna recovered from his dramatic accident on the Friday to take third on Saturday, with Jean Alesi fourth for Ferrari. Senna's McLaren teammate Gerhard Berger was fifth ahead of Benetton's Nelson Piquet, the winner of the previous race in Canada. The top ten was completed by Alain Prost in the second Ferrari, Stefano Modena in the Tyrrell, Roberto Moreno in the second Benetton and, remarkably, Olivier Grouillard in the Fondmetal. The latter seven drivers were separated by little more than 0.3 of a second.

Qualifying classification

Race

Race report

The actual race needed three attempts to get underway: the first start was aborted when a fire marshal thought he saw a fire in the back of JJ Lehto's Dallara and jumped onto the track, while Grouillard stalled at the second start and was relegated to the back of the grid.

At the third start, Patrese made a poor getaway and dropped to fourth behind Mansell, Alesi and Senna. Senna quickly overtook Alesi, while further back, Piquet and Prost dropped behind Modena and Prost also dropped behind the fast-starting Jordan of Andrea de Cesaris. Berger, meanwhile, suffered his third consecutive early retirement when his engine exploded on lap 5, the resulting oil causing Pierluigi Martini to spin off in his Minardi. Patrese started his recovery by overtaking Alesi and then out-braking Senna into turn 1, putting him into second behind Mansell.

On lap 15, Patrese passed his team-mate, who was having engine overheating concerns, for the lead. Mansell fell back towards Senna, Piquet, de Cesaris, Moreno and Alesi (who had spun), but eventually the concerns faded and the Englishman pulled away again. Alesi passed Moreno and de Cesaris for fifth, only for his clutch to fail on lap 43, team-mate Prost having dropped out on lap 17 with an alternator failure. Piquet's race ended on lap 45 with a broken wheel bearing, and when Moreno had a pit stop go wrong, Bertrand Gachot found himself fifth in the second Jordan, before spinning off.

Patrese eventually finished 1.3 seconds ahead of Mansell, with Senna almost a minute further back. De Cesaris held on to fourth after his throttle failed on the last lap and he pushed his car over the line, the stewards deciding that he had not broken the rules by starting to push after the race had ended. Moreno recovered from his botched pit stop to take fifth, while Larrousse's Éric Bernard finished sixth, the last point scored by a chassis manufactured by Lola Cars.

Race classification

Championship standings after the race

Drivers' Championship standings

Constructors' Championship standings

References

Mexican Grand Prix
Mexican Grand Prix
Grand Prix
June 1991 sports events in Mexico